Pim-on Klaisuban (born 7 July 1992) is a Thai sports shooter. She competed in the women's 10 metre air pistol event at the 2016 Summer Olympics.

References

External links
 

1992 births
Living people
Pim-on Klaisuban
Pim-on Klaisuban
Shooters at the 2016 Summer Olympics
Place of birth missing (living people)
Universiade medalists in shooting
Shooters at the 2014 Asian Games
Universiade silver medalists for Thailand
Pim-on Klaisuban
Medalists at the 2015 Summer Universiade
Pim-on Klaisuban